"Happy Hippy Hut" is a song by Australian group, Skyhooks, released in August 1994 as a double-A sided split single with "The Ballad of Oz" by fellow Australian group, Daddy Cool. The single peaked at number 35 on the ARIA Singles Chart, remaining in that position for three consecutive weeks. Daddy Cool's lead singer, Ross Wilson, was Skyhooks' early record producer.

Background and release

Early 1970s band Daddy Cool's lead singer, Ross Wilson, became Skyhooks' first record producer, in 1975. Both groups had performed at the Sunbury Pop Festival in 1974 and in 1975. In 1994, Skyhooks and Daddy Cool, both briefly reformed for a proposed stadium tour. Together they released a double-A sided single, "Happy Hippy Hut" / "The Ballad of Oz". However the tour was downgraded to the pub circuit.

Track listing

Charts

References

1994 singles
Mushroom Records singles
1994 songs
Songs written by Greg Macainsh
Skyhooks (band) songs